Andrew Oliver (January 16, 1815 – March 6, 1889) was an American politician, attorney, and jurist who served two terms as a U.S. Representative from New York from 1853 to 1857.

Early life and education
Born in Springfield, New York, in 1835 Oliver graduated from Union College in Schenectady, New York.

Career 
He studied law, was admitted to the bar and commenced practice in Penn Yan, New York in 1838. He served as judge of the Court of Common Pleas from 1843 to 1847. In 1846 he was judge of the Yates County surrogate and county courts.

Congress 
Oliver was elected as a Democrat to the Thirty-third and Thirty-fourth Congresses (March 4, 1853 – March 3, 1857). He served as chairman of the Committee on Invalid Pensions (Thirty-fourth Congress).

He was an unsuccessful candidate on the American Party ticket for reelection in 1856 to the Thirty-fifth Congress. He engaged in agricultural pursuits and also in the practice of law.

Oliver again served as county judge and surrogate judge from 1872 to 1877.

Death 
He died in Penn Yan on March 6, 1889. He was interred in Penn Yan's Lake View Cemetery.

Sources

1815 births
1889 deaths
Union College (New York) alumni
New York (state) lawyers
Democratic Party members of the United States House of Representatives from New York (state)
New York (state) Know Nothings
New York (state) state court judges
People from Springfield, New York
People from Penn Yan, New York
Burials at Lake View Cemetery (Penn Yan, New York)
19th-century American politicians
19th-century American judges
19th-century American lawyers